NearGlobal is a London, UK, based software developer and publisher of Near, a 3D city browser platform and virtual world technology that delivers survey-accurate models of real-world cities that users can explore and interact with from their computer.  The Near software was released in December 2009 with a public beta version incorporating the key shopping districts of London's West End.

Purpose
NearGlobal describes the Near product as a discovery platform, rather that a virtual world. Near allows for the seamless integration of existing web-based content into the 3D environment.

Differentiation
Near differs significantly from virtual worlds such as Second Life, Twinity and Blue Mars by focusing more on the presentation of the environment than on its users. The Near software depicts users with blades of light rather than with human avatars.

See also
 Second Life
 Twinity

References

External links
Official sites
 Near Beta
 Corporate Information

Virtual reality companies
Hypermedia
Virtual world communities